Shawn L. Bordeaux (born June 9, 1967) is an American politician. He has served as a Democratic member for the 26A district in the South Dakota Senate since 2023. From 2015 to 2022 Bordeaux served in the South Dakota House of Representatives.

References

1967 births
21st-century American politicians
Educators from South Dakota
Living people
Democratic Party members of the South Dakota House of Representatives
Native American state legislators in South Dakota
People from Mission, South Dakota